Masaji (written: 政司, 政治, 政次, 正次, 雅治 or 正二) is a masculine Japanese given name. Notable people with the name include:

, Japanese sumo wrestler
, Japanese former professional baseball pitcher
, Japanese ski jumper
, Japanese physician, general and businessman
, Japanese swimmer and businessman
Masaji Kusakabe (born 1946), Japanese golfer
, Japanese politician
, Japanese volleyball player
, Japanese baseball player
, Japanese karateka
, Japanese long jumper

Japanese masculine given names